This is a list of child actors from Germany. Films and/or television series they appeared in are mentioned only if they were still a child at the time of filming.

Current child actors (under the age of eighteen) are indicated by boldface.

A
 Elke Aberle (born 1950)
 1955: Children, Mother, and the General
 1956: Love
 1957: Widower with Five Daughters
 1958: Grabenplatz 17
 1958: Ooh … diese Ferien
 1958: Rivalen der Manege
 1958: Ein wunderbarer Sommer
 1958: Father, Mother and Nine Children
 1959: Mein ganzes Herz ist voll Musik
 1959: Jons und Erdme
 1960: Big Request Concert
 1961: What Is Father Doing in Italy?
 1964: Das Lamm
 1965: Mädchen hinter Gittern
 1966: Betty Blue
 1967: Das Kriminalmuseum: Die Kiste
 1969: Katzenaugen
 1970: Hurra, unsere Eltern sind nicht da
 1970: Nachbarn sind zum Ärgern da
Michael Ande (born 1944)
 1955: Marianne of My Youth
 1955: Reaching for the Stars
 1955: Ich weiß, wofür ich lebe
 1956: Holiday in Tyrol
 1956: Das Hirtenlied vom Kaisertal
 1956: The Trapp Family
 1956: Die Stimme der Sehnsucht
 1957: El Hakim
 1957: Scandal in Bad Ischl
 1957: Der schönste Tag meines Lebens
 1957: Die Prinzessin von St. Wolfgang
 1958: The Trapp Family in America
 1958: Don Vesuvio und das Haus der Strolche
 1958: The Doctor of Stalingrad
 1958: Majestät auf Abwegen
 1959: When the Bells Sound Clearly
 1962: 
 Helga Anders (born 1948)
 1962: Peter Pan
 1962: Max the Pickpocket
 1962: Bubusch
 1962: Die sündigen Engel
 1964: Willy Reichert in... (2 episodes)
 1964: Sie schreiben mit – Das Sparschwein
 1965: Die Bräute meiner Söhne (2 episodes)
 1965: Die Unverbesserlichen
 1965–1966: Der Forellenhof (8 episodes)
 1966: Der Kongreß amüsiert sich
 1966: Das Cello
 1966: Die Unverbesserlichen – Nichts dazugelernt
 1966: 00Sex am Wolfgangsee
 1966: How to Seduce a Playboy

B
 Patrick Bach (born 1968)
 1981: Silas
 1982: Jack Holborn
 1984: Drei und eine halbe Portion
 2007: Blöde Mütze!
Moritz Bleibtreu (born 1971)
 1982: Neues aus Uhlenbusch
 1986: Mit meinen heißen Tränen
Curt Bois (1901–1991) 
 1907: Bauernhaus und Grafenschloß (Short)
 1908: Der fidele Bauer – 1. Terzett: Ein Infant'rist, ein Artill'rist (Short)
 1908: Der fidele Bauer – 2. Terzett: Bauernmarsch (Short)
 1908: Der fidele Bauer – 3. Duettino zwischen Liesl und Heinerle (Short)
 1909: Der kleine Detektiv (Short)
 1909: Mutterliebe  (Short)
 1909: Klebolin klebt alles  (Short)
 1912: Ein neuer Erwerbszweig  (Short)
 1913: Des Pfarrers Töchterlein (The Minister's Daughter)  (Short)
 1914: Das Geschenk des Inders
 1916: Streichhölzer, kauft Streichhölzer!
 1916: BZ-Maxe & Co.
 1916: 
 1916: Tante Röschen will heiraten
 1917: Die Spinne
 1917: Abenteuer im Warenhaus (Short)
 1917: 
 1917: Das Unruhige Hotel
 1918: Der Dieb
 1918: 
 1918: Der Gast aus der vierten Dimension
 1918: So'n kleiner Schwerenöter (Short)
Radost Bokel (born 1975)
 1986: Momo 
 1986:  
 1986: Valhalla (voice)
 1988: The Secret of the Sahara (4 episodes)
 1989: Rivalen der Rennbahn
 1989: Das Nest 
 1989: Schuldig
 1989: Tatort – Herzversagen
 1990: Falsche Spuren 
 1991: Weißblaue Geschichten (3 episodes)
 1991: Eine Frau in den allerbesten Jahren: Meeresbrise
 1993: Glückliche Reise – Dominikanische Republik
 1994: Der Fahnder (Fernsehserie)
 1994: Einsatz für Lohbeck – Taucherglück
 1995: Wolffs Revier (1 episode)
Peter Bosse (1931–2018) 
 1935: Forget Me Not
 1935: All Because of the Dog
 1936: Schloß Vogelöd
 1936: Schlußakkord
 1936: Das Gäßchen zum Paradies
 1937: Woman's Love—Woman's Suffering
 1937: Immer nur du
 1938: The Woman at the Crossroads
 1939: Robert and Bertram
 Hermann Braun (1917–1945)
 1933: Hitlerjunge Quex
 1933: Der Jäger aus Kurpfalz
 1934: Holiday From Myself
 1934: Punks kommt aus Amerika
 1935: Achte mir auf aufs Gakeki (short film)
 Heidi Brühl (1942–1991)
 1954: The Last Summer
 1954: The Country Schoolmaster
 1955: Die Mädels vom Immenhof
 1955: Roman einer Siebzehnjährigen
 1956: Hochzeit auf Immenhof
 1957: Ferien auf Immenhof
 1957: Confessions of Felix Krull
 1957: Vater, unser bestes Stück
 1957: Precocious Youth
 1958: Solang’ die Sterne glüh’n
 1958: Ooh … diese Ferien
 1958: Ohne Mutter geht es nicht
 1958: Man ist nur zweimal jung
 1959: Laß mich am Sonntag nicht allein
 1959: Crime After School
 1959: 2 × Adam, 1 × Eva
 1959: The Shepherd from Trutzberg
 1960: Hit Parade 1960
 1960: Schlagerraketen – Festival der Herzen
 1960: I Will Always Be Yours
 1960: The Hero of My Dreams
 1960: Freddy and the Melody of the Night

C
Leonard Carow (born 1994) 
 2004: Tatort: Große Liebe
 2004: Stauffenberg
 2004: Typisch Mann! 
 2005: Mord am Meer
 2005: SOKO Wismar – Wikingergold 
 2006: Geile Zeiten
 2006: Unsere zehn Gebote – Gebot 5 – Du sollst nicht töten
 2007: Ich leih’ mir eine Familie
 2007: Löwenzahn – Blut – Rätselhafte Spuren
 2007: Tatort: Bevor es dunkel wird
 2008: Mondkalb
 2008: Polizeiruf 110 – Keiner schreit 
 2008: Sklaven und Herren 
 2011: 
 2011: War Horse
 2012: Der Kriminalist – Magdalena 
 2012: Und alle haben geschwiegen 
 2012: Klinik am Alex – Leidenschaften 
 2012: Stolberg – Klassenkampf 
 2012: Tatort: Dinge, die noch zu tun sind

E
 Sabine Eggerth (1943–2017)
 1953: Annaluise and Anton
 1953: The Little Match Girl
 1954: Maxie
 1955: His Daughter is Called Peter
 1956: As Long as the Roses Bloom
 1959: That's No Way to Land a Man

F 
Elfie Fiegert (born 1946)
 1952: Toxi
 1953: Stars Over Colombo
 1955: The Dark Star
 1957: Two Bavarians in the Harem
 1961: Our Crazy Aunts
 1963: The House in Montevideo
 1964: Our Crazy Aunts in the South Seas
Lotte Flack (born 1994)
 2009: Pope Joan
Cornelia Froboess (born 1943)
 The Sinful Border (1951)
 Ideal Woman Sought (1952)
 Three Days of Fear (1952)
 The Big Star Parade (1954)
 Conny and Peter Make Music (1960)
 Mariandl (1961)
 My Husband, the Economic Miracle (1961)

G 
Götz George (1938-2016)
 1953: When the White Lilacs Bloom Again
 1954: The Great Test
 Sarah Kim Gries (born 1990)
 2003: Die Wilden Kerle
 2003: Geschichten aus der Nachkriegszeit (TV film)
 2005: Die Wilden Kerle 2
 2006: Die Wilden Kerle 3
 2006: Nie mehr zweite Liga! (TV film)
 2007: Die Wilden Kerle 4
 2008: Die Wilden Kerle 5 – Hinter dem Horizont
 2008: SOKO 5113 (Fernsehserie, episode 34x04 Fairway to Heaven)
Cornelia Gröschel (born 1987)
 1998: Heimatgeschichten – Ein rettender Engel
 1998–1999: In aller Freundschaft 
 1999: Das Geheimnis (short film)
 1999: Schlosshotel Orth – Spurensuche 
 2000: Einmal Himmel und retour
 2001: Klinik unter Palmen (3 episodes)
 2001: Heidi 
 2002: Lilly unter den Linden 
 2003: Hilfe, ich bin Millionär 
 2003: Für immer verloren 
 2004: Experiment Bootcamp 
 2005: In aller Freundschaft – Zerrissenes Herz
 Gustl Gstettenbaur (1914–1996)
 1928: The Page Boy at the Golden Lion
 1928: Band of Thieves
 1928: Volga Volga
 1929: The Eccentric
 1929: Fight of the Tertia
 1929: Woman in the Moon
 1929: The Mistress and her Servant
 1929: Big City Children
 1930: Delicatessen
 1930: Dolly Gets Ahead
 1930: Madame Pompadour
 1930: Vienna, City of Song
 1930: Die zärtlichen Verwandten
 1930: Kohlhiesels Töchter
 1930: Queen of the Night
 1931: Schubert's Dream of Spring
 1931: Der Storch streikt
 1931: Kyritz – Pyritz
 1931: Im Banne der Berge
 1931: The Wrong Husband
 1931: Elisabeth of Austria
 1931: The Night Without Pause
 1932: Girls to Marry
 1932: Spoiling the Game
 1932: The Secret of Johann Orth
 1932: Paprika
 Isa Günther (born 1938)
 1950: Two Times Lotte
 1952: Die Wirtin von Maria Wörth
 1953: Ich und meine Frau
 1954: An jedem Finger zehn
 1954: Der erste Kuß
 1955: Du bist die Richtige
 1956: Liebe, Sommer und Musik
 1956: Die Fischerin vom Bodensee
 1957: Vier Mädels aus der Wachau
 1957: Die Zwillinge vom Zillertal
 Jutta Günther (born 1938)
 1950: Two Times Lotte
 1952: Die Wirtin von Maria Wörth
 1953: Ich und meine Frau
 1954: An jedem Finger zehn
 1954: Der erste Kuß
 1955: Du bist die Richtige
 1956: Liebe, Sommer und Musik
 1956: Die Fischerin vom Bodensee
 1957: Vier Mädels aus der Wachau
 1957: Die Zwillinge vom Zillertal

H
Karoline Herfurth (born 1984)
 1995: Ferien jenseits des Mondes
 2000: Crazy
 2000: Küss mich, Frosch
 2001: Mädchen, Mädchen
 2002: Big Girls Don't Cry
 Martin Herzberg (1911–1972)
 1918: Jugendliebe
 1919: Die Sühne der Martha Marx
 1919: Das Geheimnis von Schloß Holloway
 1919: Pogrom
 1920: Die Benefiz-Vorstellung der vier Teufel
 1920: Der Halunkengeiger
 1921: Store forventninger
 1922: Lasse Månsson fra Skaane
 1922: David Copperfield
 1922: Den sidste dans
 1923: Paganini
 1923: The Hungarian Princess
 1923: All for Money
 1923: Wienerbarnet
 1924: Kan kvinder fejle?
 1924: Carlos and Elisabeth
 1924: Comedians of Life
 1925: The Blackguard
 1925: Freies Volk
 1927: Students' Love
 1927: Mary Stuart
 1928: The Age of Seventeen
 1928: Band of Thieves
 1929: Misled Youth
 1929: Youthful Indiscretion
 1929: The Youths
 Louis Hofmann (born 1997)
 2006–2009: Die Ausflieger
 2010: Danni Lowinski
 2010: Der verlorene Vater
 2010: Tod in Istanbul
 2011: Wilsberg – Aus Mangel an Beweisen
 2011: Alarm für Cobra 11 – Die Autobahnpolizei
 2011: 
 2012: 
 2012: Stolberg
 2013: Der fast perfekte Mann
 2013: SOKO Köln – Der stille Mord
 2014: 
 2015: Sanctuary
 2015: Land of Mine

K 
 Roland Kaiser (1943-1998)
 1954: Don't Worry About Your Mother-in-Law
 1954: Eskapade
 1954: The Faithful Hussar
 1954: Emil and the Detectives
 1955: Meine Kinder und ich
 1956: Du bist Musik
 1957: Heute blau und morgen blau
 1957: Ferien auf Immenhof
 1957: The Girl and the Legend
 1957: The Zürich Engagement
 1957: Vater, unser bestes Stück
 1957: Casino de Paris
 1957: Liebe, Jazz und Übermut
 1958: Ohne Mutter geht es nicht
 1958: Ihr 106. Geburtstag
 1958: Munchhausen in Africa
 1958: Kleine Leute mal ganz groß
 1958: Man in the River
 1959: Roses for the Prosecutor
 1959: What a Woman Dreams of in Springtime
 1961: Immer Ärger mit dem Bett
 1961: Ramona
Nikola Kastner (born 1983)
 2001: Bronski und Bernstein (8 episodes)
 Christine Kaufmann (1945–2017)
 1952: The White Horse Inn
 1953: Prosecutor Corda
 1953: Salto Mortale
 1953: The Monastery's Hunter
 1954: Rose-Girl Resli
 1954: Der schweigende Engel
 1955: When the Alpine Roses Bloom
 1956: Ein Herz schlägt für Erika
 1956: Die Stimme der Sehnsucht
 1957: The Winemaker of Langenlois
 1957: Widower with Five Daughters
 1958: Mädchen in Uniform
 1958: Die singenden Engel von Tirol
 1958: Der veruntreute Himmel
 1959: Alle lieben Peter
 1959: Winter Holidays
 1959: The Last Days of Pompeii
 1959: First Love
 1960: Un trono para Cristy
 1960: Toto, Fabrizi and the Young People Today
 1960: Labbra rosse
 1960: The Last Pedestrian
 1960: Town Without Pity
 1961: Via Mala
 1961: Un nommé La Rocca
 1961: The Phony American
 1961: Constantine and the Cross
 1961: Degenduell
 1961: Taras Bulba
 1962: Terror After Midnight
 1962: Escape from East Berlin
Wolfgang Kieling (1924–1985)
 1936: Maria the Maid
 1936: Guten Abend, gute Nacht
 1936: Hier irrt Schiller
 1937: Heimweh
 1937: The Kreutzer Sonata
 1938: Altes Herz geht auf die Reise
 1938: Women for Golden Hill
 1938: Klimbusch macht Wochenende
 1938: Träume sind Schäume
 1939: The Journey to Tilsit
 1940: Falstaff in Vienna
 1940: Herz geht vor Anker
 1940: Seitensprünge
 1941: Jenny und der Herr im Frack
 1941: Krach im Vorderhaus
 Nastassja Kinski (born 1961)
 1975: The Wrong Move
 1976: To the Devil a Daughter
 1977: Tatort: Reifezeugnis
 1977: Notsignale (episode: Im Nest)
 1978: Passion Flower Hotel
 1978: Stay as You Are
 1979: Tess
 Mats Köhlert (born 1998) 
 Advertisements for Kinder Chocolate, BMW, IKEA, Smarties, McDonald’s and Tchibo
 Oliver Korittke (born 1968)
 1972–1974: Sesame Street
 1976: Aktion Grün
 1977: Die drei Klumberger (13 episodes)
 1981: Sternensommer (6 episodes)
 1984–1985: Eine Klasse für sich (25 episodes)
 1985: The Black Forest Clinic: Die falsche Diagnose
 1986: 
 1986: Ich heirate eine Familie: Heimlichkeiten

L 
 Frederick Lau (born 1989) 
 1999: Achterbahn – Der große Bruder
 2000: 
 2001: Jonathans Liebe
 2001: Wie angelt man sich einen Müllmann?
 2001: Drei Stern Rot
 2001: Doppelter Einsatz Berlin – Wehe dem, der liebt
 2001: Dr. Sommerfeld – Neues vom Bülowbogen – Ein Dream-Team
 2002: Der Tod ist kein Beinbruch – Der Opa
 2002: Der Brief des Kosmonauten
 2002: Kleeblatt küsst Kaktus
 2002: Fremde Kinder – Schlangen im Feuer (voice)
 2003–2004: Stefanie – Eine Frau startet durch
 2003: Das fliegende Klassenzimmer
 2003: Rotlicht – Im Dickicht der Großstadt
 2003: Vorsicht – keine Engel! – Handy-Fieber
 2004: Polizeiruf 110 – Die Mutter von Monte Carlo
 2004: Leipzig Homicide – Glückliche Familie
 2004: Sterne leuchten auch am Tag
 2004: Bibi Blocksberg und das Geheimnis der blauen Eulen
 2004: Wer küsst schon einen Leguan?
 2004: Bergkristall
 2004: Der verzauberte Otter
 2005: The Call of the Toad
 2005: 
 2005: Schloss Einstein (episodes 341–343)
 2005: Cologne P.D. – Heckenschütze
 2005: Unsere 10 Gebote – Gebot 2: Du sollst den Namen des Herrn, deines Gottes, nicht missbrauchen
 2005: Die Mauer – Berlin ’61
 2006: An die Grenze
 2006: Der Kriminalist – Totgeschwiegen
 2007: Tatort – Bevor es dunkel wird
 2007: Liebling, wir haben geerbt!
 2007: Ein spätes Mädchen
 2007: Wie verführ' ich meinen Ehemann
 Inge Landgut (1922–1986)
 1927: Violantha
 1928: Angst
 1929: Circumstantial Evidence
 1929: Perjury
 1929: A Mother's Love
 1929: The Unusual Past of Thea Carter
 1929: Women on the Edge
 1930: Phantoms of Happiness
 1930: Der Detektiv des Kaisers
 1930: Bookkeeper Kremke
 1931: M
 1931: Emil and the Detectives
 1931: Louise, Queen of Prussia
 1934: The Assumption of Hannele
 1935: Das Einmaleins der Liebe
 1937: Love Can Lie
 1938: The Girl of Last Night
 1938: Was tun, Sybille
 Nico Liersch (born 2000)
 2008: Der Einsturz
 2009: Die geerbte Familie
 2010: Die Liebe kommt mit dem Christkind
 2010: Herzflimmern – die Klinik am See
 2011: Afrika ruft nach dir
 2011: Das Traumhotel – Brasilien
 2012: Schafkopf oder a bisserl was geht immer - Junior und Senior
 2012: Inga Lindström – Ein Lied für Solveig
 2012: Kokowääh 2
 2013: The Book Thief
 2016: 
 2017: In aller Freundschaft – Die jungen Ärzte – Was wir geben
 2018: Daheim in den Bergen – Schuld und Vergebung

M 
Jacob Matschenz (born 1984)
 2001: Kleine Kreise

N 
Loni Nest (1916–1990)
 1918: The Story of Dida Ibsen
 1919: Opium
 1919: Die Ehe der Frau Mary
 1919: Harakiri
 1920: Kämpfende Gewalten oder Welt ohne Krieg
 1920: The Merry-Go-Round
 1920: Patience
 1920: Johannes Goth
 1920: The Golem: How He Came into the World
 1920: The Guilt of Lavinia Morland
 1920: The Wandering Image
 1921: Violet
 1921: Man Overboard
 1921: A Blackmailer's Trick
 1921: The Haunted Castle
 1921: Die Minderjährige – Zu jung fürs Leben
 1921: Parisian Women
 1921: The Convict of Cayenne
 1921: The Pearl of the Orient
 1921: Sturmflut des Lebens
 1922: Sunken Worlds
 1922: Nosferatu
 1922: Tabitha, Stand Up
 1922: A Dying Nation (2 parts)
 1922: Aus den Erinnerungen eines Frauenarztes (2 parts)
 1922: Alone in the Jungle
 1923: Quarantine
 1923: The Little Napoleon
 1923: Tragedy of Love
 1923: Fräulein Raffke
 1923: Der Evangelimann
 1923: Black Earth
 1924: Two Children
 1924: Mutter und Kind
 1925: Fire of Love
 1925: Kinderfreuden (short film)
 1925: The Blackguard
 1925: Joyless Street
 1925: A Song from Days of Youth
 1928: The Saint and Her Fool
 1928: The Story of a Little Parisian
 1933: L’Épervier
 Jannis Niewöhner (born 1992)
 2002: Tatort: Fakten, Fakten …
 2004: Für immer Edelweiss (short film)
 2004: Bang-Bang (short film)
 2005: Der Schatz der weißen Falken
 2006: TKKG und die rätselhafte Mind-Machine
 2007: Die Wilden Hühner und die Liebe
 2007: Der Baum (short film)
 2007: Von Müttern und Töchtern
 2008: Sommer
 2009: Gangs
 2010: Freche Mädchen 2
 2010: Sant’Agostino
 2010:

O 
Jimi Blue Ochsenknecht (born 1991)
 1999: Enlightenment Guaranteed
 2003: 
 2005: Auf den Spuren der Vergangenheit
 2005: 
 2006: 
 2007: 
 2008: 
 2008: Sommer
 2009: Gangs
 Uwe Ochsenknecht (born 1956)
 1972: Freizeitraum, Bau 2
 Wilson Gonzalez Ochsenknecht (born 1990)
 1999: Enlightenment Guaranteed
 2003: 
 2005: 
 2006: 
 2006: The Ugly Duckling and Me! (voice)
 2007: 
 2008: Freche Mädchen
 2008: Crash (short film)
Jürgen Ohlsen (1917–1994)
 1933: Hitlerjunge Quex
 1933: Alle machen mit (short film)
 1935: Wunder des Fliegens: Der Film eines deutschen Fliegers
 Tommi Ohrner (born 1965)
 1969: Der Kommissar – Die Schrecklichen 
 1970: Hurra, unsere Eltern sind nicht da
 1970: Nachbarn sind zum Ärgern da
 1971: Hilfe, die Verwandten kommen
 1974: Kli-Kla-Klawitter 
 1974: Stolen Heaven
 1974: Der Kommissar – Drei Brüder
 1976: Das Haus der Krokodile 
 1977: Heidi, Girl of the Alps (voice)
 1977: Babbelgamm 
 1977: Brennendes Geheimnis
 1979–1980: Timm Thaler 
 1979: Merlin 
 1982: Manni, der Libero
 1982: 
 1982: Ein dicker Hund
 1983: Die unglaublichen Abenteuer des Guru Jakob
 1983: Plem, Plem – Die Schule brennt

P 
Josefine Preuß (born 1986)
 1998: ORB-Club
 2000–2003, 2006: Schloss Einstein (168 episodes)
 2002: Pengo! Steinzeit
 2004: Sabine (episode 1x02: Kurzer Prozess)
 2004: Inspektor Rolle'''': Herz in Not
 2004: Das Mörderspiel – Die Blumen des Bösen
 2004: Klassenfahrt – Geknutscht wird immer
 2004: Jargo

R 
 Nick Romeo Reimann (born 1998)
 2005: Bresso – Schaukel (advertisement)
 2006: SOKO 5113 – Ein besseres Leben
 2006: 
 2007: 
 2008: 
 2009: 
 2010: 
 2011: 
 2012: 
 2012: Der Cop und der Snob
 2012: Prag – Bis einer geht (Music video)
 2013: V8 – Du willst der Beste sein
 2015: SOKO 5113 – Auf Abwegen
 2015: V8 – Die Rache der Nitros
 2016: The Old Fox – Liebesrausch
 2016: In our Country
 Grete Reinwald (1902–1983)
 1914: Ein Sommernachtstraum in unserer Zeit
 1916: Proletardrengen
 1919: Die Schuld
 1920: The Night of Decision
 1920: Kämpfende Gewalten oder Welt ohne Krieg
 1920: Der Menschheit Anwalt
 1920: Das Ende des Abenteuers Paolo de Gaspardo
 Hanni Reinwald (1903–1978)
 1913: Der Film von der Königin Luise
 1913: Der Feind im Land
 1913: Der wankende Glaube
 1914: Ein Sommernachtstraum in unserer Zeit
 1914: Bismarck
 1914: Ein Kindesherz
 1916: Proletardrengen
 1919: Revenge Is Mine
 1920: Mascotte
 1921: Verrat auf Schloß Treuenfels
 1921: Der Silberkönig (4 parts)
 1921: Der Bagnosträfling
 Otto Reinwald (1899–1968)
 1913: Der Film von der Königin Luise
 1914: Ein Sommernachtstraum in unserer Zeit
 1914: The Mysterious X
 1914: The Silent Mill
 1914: Im Schützengraben
 1915: Fluch der Schönheit
 1915: Der zwölfjährige Kriegsheld
 1915: Pengenes magt
 1915: Filmens datter
 1915: Katastrofen i Kattegat
 1916: Proletardrengen
 1916: Blind Justice
 1916: Fliegende Schatten
 1916: Das Mysterium des Schlosses Clauden
 1917: Fliegende Schatten
 1917: Die Fußspur
 1917: Giovannis Rache
 Hans Richter (1919–2008)
 1931: Emil and the Detectives
 1931: The Night Without Pause
 1932: The Blue of Heaven
 1933: Manolescu, der Fürst der Diebe
 1933: The Burning Secret
 1933: Hände aus dem Dunkel
 1933: Fahrt ins Grüne
 1933: Hitlerjunge Quex
 1933: The Page from the Dalmasse Hotel
 1933: Three Bluejackets and a Blonde
 1933: Keine Angst vor Liebe
 1934: A Precocious Girl
 1934: The Black Whale
 1934: The English Marriage
 1935: Knock Out
 1935: Großreinemachen
 1935: Ein ganzer Kerl
 1935: The Dreamer
 1936: The Court Concert
 1936: Soldaten – Kameraden
 1936: The Violet of Potsdamer Platz
 1936: The Girl Irene
 1937: Vor Liebe wird gewarnt
 1937: Ein Volksfeind
 1937: The Man Who Was Sherlock Holmes
 1937: Das große Abenteuer
Ilja Richter (born 1952)
 1962: So toll wie anno dazumal
 1963: Schwarz auf Weiß
 1963: Charade (voice)
 1963: Piccadilly Zero Hour 12
 1964: Die Schneekönigin
 1967: Till, der Junge von nebenan
 1969: I'm an Elephant, Madame
 1969: Tony’s Freunde
 1969–1970: 4-3-2-1 Hot & Sweet 
 1970: When the Mad Aunts Arrive
 1970: Unsere Pauker gehen in die Luft
 1970: Musik, Musik – da wackelt die Penne
 Paula Riemann (born 1993)
 2004: Bergkristall
 2006: Die Wilden Hühner
 2006: Störtebeker
 2007: Die Wilden Hühner und die Liebe
 Max Riemelt (born 1984)
 1997: Eine Familie zum Küssen
 1998: Zwei allein (six episodes)
 1999: Weihnachtsmärchen – Wenn alle Herzen schmelzen
 2000: Der Bär ist los!
 2000: Brennendes Schweigen
 2001: Mädchen, Mädchen
 2001: Mein Vater und andere Betrüger
 2002: Alphateam – Die Lebensretter im OP: Respekt
 2002: Sextasy
 2002: Balko: Giftzwerg
Yella Rottländer (born 1964)
 1973: The Scarlet Letter
 1974: Alice in the Cities
 1976: Paul und Paulinchen

S
Hans Joachim Schaufuß (1918–1941)
 1931: Die Bräutigamswitwe
 1931: Emil and the Detectives
 1932: The White Demon
 1932: Peter Voss, Thief of Millions
 1933: The Burning Secret
 1933: Der Zarewitsch
 1934: Nischt geht über die Gemütlichkeit
 1934: Annette in Paradise
 1934: Die Töchter ihrer Exzellenz
 1935: The Dreamer
 1936: Stradivaris Schülergeige
 1936: Stjenka Rasin
 1936: Game on Board
 1936: The Beggar Student
 Tom Schilling (born 1982)
 1988: Stunde der Wahrheit
 1996: Hallo, Onkel Doc!: Manege frei
 1999: Tatort: Kinder der Gewalt
 1999: Schlaraffenland
 2000: Crazy
 2000: Der Himmel kann warten
 Paula Schramm (born 1989)
 1997: Hallo, Onkel Doc!: Albert
 1997: Praxis Bülowbogen (episodes 114–122)
 1998: OP ruft Dr. Bruckner: Jung und eingesperrt
 1999-2000: Our Charly (5th & 6th season)
 2000: Gripsholm
 2000: Beim nächsten Coup … wird alles anders
 2001: Fahr zur Hölle, Schwester
 2001–2006: Schloss Einstein (episodes 171–384)
 2003: Meine schönsten Jahre: Liebesreigen Ost
 2004–2006: Check Eins (trailers/clips of the shows)
 2004: Check Eins (Making Of Vier gegen Z)
 2004: Appassionata (voice)
 2005: Abschnitt 40: Mädchen und Jungs
 2006: French for Beginners
 2006: Allein unter Bauern (episodes 1–10)
 2007–2008: Hallo Robbie! (episodes 1–5)
 2007: In aller Freundschaft: Die jungen Ärzte
 Hannelore Schroth (1922–1987)
 1931: Dann schon lieber Lebertran (short film)
 1939: Spiel im Sommerwind
 1939: Weißer Flieder
 1939: Kitty and the World Conference
 1939: The Governor
 1940: Friedrich Schiller – The Triumph of a Genius
 Emilia Schüle (born 1992)
 2005: Nichts weiter als (short film)
 2006: Guten Morgen, Herr Grothe
 2007: Manatu – Nur die Wahrheit rettet Dich
 2008: Brüderchen und Schwesterchen
 2008: Lucky Fritz
 2008: Freche Mädchen
 2009: Gangs
 2009: Meine wunderbare Familie
 2009: Faktor 8 – Der Tag ist gekommen
 2010: Rock It!
 2010: Freche Mädchen 2
 2010: Aschenputtel
 Jannik Schümann (born 1992)
 2003: Die Rettungsflieger: Rivalen im Cockpit
 2007: Das Glück am anderen Ende der Welt 
 2007: Tatort: Liebeshunger
 2007: The Three Investigators and the Secret of Skeleton Island (voice)
 2009: The Three Investigators and the Secret of Terror Castle (voice)
 2009: Stubbe – Von Fall zu Fall: Im toten Winkel
 2009: Die Pfefferkörner (4 Folgen)
 2009: WinneToons – Die Legende vom Schatz im Silbersee (voice)
 2010: Dance Academy (voice)
 2010: Kommissarin Lucas – Wenn alles zerbricht
 2010: SOKO Wismar: Die Prophezeiung
 2010: Garmischer Bergspitzen
 Emma Schweiger (born 2002)
 2005: Barefoot 
 2007: Rabbit Without Ears
 2009: Men in the City
 2009: Rabbit Without Ears 2
 2011: Kokowääh
 2012: Und weg bist du 
 2013: Kokowääh 2
 2013: Keinohrhase und Zweiohrküken (voice)
 2014: Head Full of Honey
 2016: Conni & Co
 2017: Conni & Co 2 – Das Geheimnis des T-Rex
 2018: Head Full of Honey
 Lilli Schweiger (born 1998) 
 2007: Rabbit Without Ears
 2009: Rabbit Without Ears 2
 2011–2012: Die Pfotenbande (5 Episodes)
 Luna Schweiger (born 1997)
 2007: Rabbit Without Ears
 2009: Phantomschmerz
 2009: Rabbit Without Ears 2
 2011: Kokowääh
 2011: Die Pfotenbande (12 episodes)
 2012: Guardians
 2013: Kokowääh 2
 2013: Tatort: Willkommen in Hamburg
 2014: Tatort: Kopfgeld
 Leon Seidel (born 1996)
 2009: Berlin 36
 2010: Teufelskicker
 2009: Tatort: Der Fluch der Mumie
 2009–2011: Stromberg (4 episodes)
 2010: Wintertochter
 2011: 
 2012: 
 2014: Nachbarn Süß-Sauer
 2014: Die Auserwählten
 2014: Der Lehrer: Kann ich hier mobben?
 2014: Cologne P.D.: Auf der schiefen Bahn
 Klaus Detlef Sierck (1925–1944)
 1935: Die Saat geht auf 
 1937: Streit um den Knaben Jo 
 1937: Serenade 
 1938: Covered Tracks
 1938: Sehnsucht nach Afrika 
 1938: Shadows Over St. Pauli
 1938: A Prussian Love Story
 1939: The Immortal Heart 
 1939: Cadets
 1939: The Right to Love
 1940: Aus erster Ehe 
1941: Kopf hoch, Johannes! 
 1942: The Great King

T
Theo Trebs (born 1994)
 2006: Die kleine Benimmschule 2 (educational video)
 2009: 
 2009: Prinz & Bottelknabe
 2009: Lilly the Witch: The Dragon and the Magic Book
 2009: The White Ribbon
 2010: Rammbock: Berlin Undead
 2010: Inspektor Barbarotti – Mensch ohne Hund
 2011: Lessons of a Dream
 2012: Tatort – Der Wald steht schwarz und schweiget
 2012: Tatort – Fette Hunde
 2012: A Coffee in Berlin
Nora Tschirner (born 1981)
 1996: Achterbahn – Der Ferienjob

U
 Janina Uhse (born 1989)
 2002–2003: Die Kinder vom Alstertal (3 episodes)
 2002: Der Rattenkönig
 2003: Die Pfefferkörner: Diamantenfieber
 2003–2008: Der Landarzt (18 episodes)
 2005: Die Rettungsflieger: Irrtümer
 Kostja Ullmann (born 1984)
 1996: Das Rennen (short film)
 1998/1999: Alphateam – Die Lebensretter im OP (episodes 2.24 and 4.14)
 1999: Die Pfefferkörner: Die Schimmelprinzessin (episode 6)
 1999: Strandnähe (short film)
 1999: König auf Mallorca
 1999: Zwei Männer am Herd
 2000: Albtraum einer Ehe
 2001: Stahlnetz: Das Gläserne Paradies
 2001: Das Duo – Tod am Strand (episode 1.2)
 2002: Großstadtrevier: Rosenkrieger
 2002: Familie XXL
 2002: Stubbe – Von Fall zu Fall: Das vierte Gebot

V 

 Lea van Acken (born 1999)
 2014: Stations of the Cross
 2015: 
 2015: Homeland (episode 5x02)
 2016: Das Tagebuch der Anne Frank
 2016: 
 2016: Spreewaldkrimi – Spiel mit dem Tod
 2016: Ferien
 2017: Bibi & Tina: Tohuwabohu Total
 2017: Ostwind – Aufbruch nach Ora
 2017: Fack ju Göhte 3
Lisa Vicari (born 1997)
 2009: Tunnelblicke (short film)
 2010: Viki Ficki (short film)
 2010: Hanni & Nanni
 2011: Und dennoch lieben wir
 2011: Hell
 2011: Einer wie Bruno
 2013: Unter Verdacht: Ohne Vergebung 
 2014: Playing Doctor
 2014: Die Chefin: Tod eines Lehrers
Max von der Groeben (born 1992)
 2004–2005: Bernds Hexe
 2005: The Little Polar Bear 2: The Mysterious Island (voice)
 2005: Rotkäppchen
 2006–2008: Nouky und seine Freunde (German version of Playhouse Disney)
 2008: Lenny & Twiek (9 episodes, voice)
 2007: Spurlos – Alles muss versteckt sein
 2009: Danni Lowinski – Mutterkind
 Constantin von Jascheroff (born 1986)
 1995: 
 1995: Babyfon – Mörder im Kinderzimmer
 1995: The Seventh Brother (voice)
 1996–2003: Monster by Mistake (voice)
 1996: Faust – Kinder der Straße 
 1997: A.S. (episodes 2x01–2x02)
 1998: Hallo, Onkel Doc! (episode 5x07)
 1998: Titus, der Satansbraten 
 1998: Titus und der Fluch der Diamanten
 1999: Star Wars: Episode I – The Phantom Menace (voice)
 1999: E-M@il an Gott 
 1999: Magnolia (voice)
 2000: The Little Vampire (voice)
 2000: The Life & Adventures of Santa Claus (voice)
 2000: Anke (episode 1x07)
 2001: Die Boegers
 2001: Yu-Gi-Oh! (voice)
 2001–2004: Lizzie McGuire (voice)
 2003–2006: Xiaolin Showdown (voice)
 2003–2006: The Save-Ums! (voice)
 2003: The Lizzie McGuire Movie (voice)
 2003: Holes (voice)
 2003: Sperling – Sperling und der Mann im Abseits
 2004: Jargo
 2004: Schloss Einstein (1 episode)

W 
Lara Wendel (born 1965)
 1972: My Dear Killer
 1972: The Italian Connection
 1973: Redneck
 1974: The Perfume of the Lady in Black
 1977: Maladolescenza
 1978: Little Girl in Blue Velvet
 1979: Un'ombra nell'ombra
 1979: Un dramma borghese
 1979: Ernesto
 1980: Desideria – La vita interiore
 1981: Il falco e la colomba
 1982: Identification of a Woman
 1982: Tenebrae
 Rolf Wenkhaus (1917–1942)
 1931: Emil and the Detectives
 1932: Spoiling the Game
 1933: S.A. Mann Brand
 Philip Wiegratz (born 1993)
 2005: Charlie and the Chocolate Factory
 2005: 
 2006: Die Wilden Hühner
 2006: Berndivent: Kasten
 2007: Die Wilden Hühner und die Liebe
 2008: Krimi.de: Chatgeflüster
 2009: Die Wölfe: Nichts kann uns trennen
 2009: Die Wilden Hühner und das Leben
 2010–2011: Der Schlunz – Die Serie (2 episodes)

Z
 Helena Zengel (born 2008)
 2013: Spreewaldkrimi: Mörderische Hitze
 2016: 
 2016–2017: Die Spezialisten – Im Namen der Opfer (2 episodes)
 2017: Der gute Bulle
 2017: Die Tochter
 2019: System Crasher
 2019: Inga Lindström: Familienfest in Sommerby
 2020: News of the World
Sonja Ziemann (1926-2020)
 1940: Der Schatz
 1941: A Gust of Wind
 1943: Die Jungfern vom Bischofsberg
 1943: Geliebter Schatz
 1944: 
 1944: Hundstage
 Wolfgang Zilzer (1901–1991)
 1915: Der Barbier von Filmersdorf
 1917: Die Spinne
 1917: Der Blusenkönig

See also

 List of Germans

References 

 List
Germany
Actors, Child
German film-related lists
German television-related lists